is a waterfall on the Hayato River within the boundaries of the  Tanzawa-Ōyama Quasi-National Park, in Sagamihara, Kanagawa Prefecture, Japan.

The upper falls has a height of 40 meters, and the lower has a height of 10 meters. The view is blocked by a great rock protruding from the middle of the upper fall, so that the whole waterfall can be seen clearly only from the bottom. The Hayato Great Falls is located deep within Tanzawa Mountains, and is accessible only by a two-hour hike on poorly marked and maintained mountain trails from the nearest road. It is inaccessible during inclement weather, and thus has few visitors.

The Hayato Great Falls is listed as one of  "Japan’s Top 100 Waterfalls", in a listing published by the Japanese Ministry of the Environment in 1990.

References
Must Love Japan
Nippon KIchi article
  Ministry of Environment

Notes

Waterfalls of Japan
Landforms of Kanagawa Prefecture
Tourist attractions in Kanagawa Prefecture